Alberto Penney (1888–1945) was an Argentine footballer, who played in Boca Juniors and River Plate.

Biography 

Alberto Penney was born in Buenos Aires, son of British immigrants. In 1905 he was incorporated with his brother Arturo Patricio Penney, into the team of Boca Juniors, participating in tournaments second division of Argentina. In 1912 Penney was transferred to River Plate, playing the championship of that year, where he had scored 2 goals. In the championship 1913, he scoring 13 goals for River, and participated in the first Superclásico against Boca Juniors.

In 1914 Penney played the Copa de Competencia Jockey Club and the Tie Cup, both titles won by River.

Titles

References

External links

www.historiadeboca.com.ar

Argentine footballers
Argentina international footballers
Footballers from Buenos Aires
Club Atlético River Plate footballers
Boca Juniors footballers
Argentine people of English descent
British Argentine
Association football midfielders
Río de la Plata
1888 births
1945 deaths